Werner Wolff may refer to:
Werner Wolff (musician) (1883–1961), Hamburg Opera conductor and Chattanooga Opera founder
Werner Wolff (psychologist), taught at Bard College from 1942 to 1957
Werner Wolff (SS officer), German officer and Knight's Cross of the Iron Cross recipient
Werner Wolff (photographer) (1911–2002), German-born American photojournalist